Swimming, for the 2017 Island Games, held at the Solbergabadet, Visby, Gotland, Sweden in June 2017. The events were held in a short course (25 m) pool.

Medal table

Results

Men’s

Mixed

Women’s

References

External links
 2017 Time Standards

Island
2017
Swimming